Stagonosporopsis is a genus of ascomycote fungi, containing several pathogens to plants.

Some of these pathogens affect Hippeastrum (S. curtisii).

Taxonomy 

Stagonosporopsis has recently undergone major reorganisation together with many other genera within the Pleosporales. Therefore, a number of species such as Stagonosporopsis curtisii have been redistributed. S. curtisii is now known as Peyronellaea curtisii.

See also 

 Plant pathology

References

External links 
 Index Fungorum
 USDA ARS Fungal Database

Pleosporales
Dothideomycetes genera
Fungal plant pathogens and diseases